Jordan Miller (born in New York, New York) is an American figure skater. He is the 2006 US National Junior silver medalist, 2007 US National Senior competitor, and won the silver medal at the 2006 Ondrej Nepela Memorial. Miller also worked as a figure skating judge but has moved on to pursue a career in law and is currently studying at the University of Virginia School of Law.

Competitive highlights

J = Junior level

References

 

American male single skaters
Living people
Sportspeople from New York City
Year of birth missing (living people)